Ron Kennedy (May 7, 1953 – July 9, 2009) was a Canadian ice hockey player and coach.

Early life
Kennedy was born in North Battleford, Saskatchewan, Canada.

Career
Kennedy played minor-league hockey in North America, Sweden, the Netherlands, Germany, and Austria before moving to coaching.

Coaching career
Kennedy's last position was coaching for Innsbruck of the Austrian Hockey League.

His coaching career included:
Medicine Hat Tigers (Western Hockey League)
Villach, Austria - won the Austrian championship in his first year (1992–1994)
New York Islanders assistant coach
EC Hannover, Eisbären Berlin and ERC Ingolstadt (Deutsche Eishockey Liga)
Head coach of the Austrian national team (1996–2002)
Villach, Austria (second time)
Innsbruck (Austria) and Bolzano (Italy)
Canadian national team coach for the 2006 Deutschland Cup

Death
Kennedy resigned after his December 2008 diagnosis of brain cancer, from which he died, aged 56, in Klagenfurt, Austria.

References

External links

1953 births
2009 deaths
Canadian expatriate ice hockey players in Austria
Canadian ice hockey coaches
Canadian ice hockey right wingers
ECH Chur players
Deaths from cancer in Austria
Deaths from brain tumor
Estevan Bruins players
Fort Worth Texans players
Fort Worth Wings players
Hannover EC players
Ice hockey people from Saskatchewan
Indianapolis Checkers (CHL) players
Innsbrucker EV players
Kalamazoo Wings (1974–2000) players
Medicine Hat Tigers coaches
Muskegon Mohawks players
Nijmegen Devils players
New Westminster Bruins players
New York Islanders coaches
New York Islanders draft picks
Nybro Vikings players
Sportspeople from North Battleford
Winnipeg Jets (WHA) draft picks